Anagroidea is a genus of fairyflies within the family Mymaridae. There are currently 5 species assigned to the genus.

Species 

 Anagroidea boweni 
 Anagroidea dryas 
 Anagroidea dubia 
 Anagroidea himalayana 
 Anagroidea marina

References 

Mymaridae
Hymenoptera genera